Canada competed at the 2011 World Championships in Athletics from August 27 to September 4 in Daegu, South Korea.

Team selection

A team of 32 athletes was announced in preparation for the competition. Selected athletes have achieved one of the competition's qualifying standards. The team also includes two athletes who will compete in the exhibition events, Erik Gauthier
T53 400m for men and Diane Roy T54 800m for women.

There are a few notable absences on this year's team, including Priscilla Lopes-Schliep, a former Olympic medalist and Canadian record holder in the 100 meter hurdles who is sitting out the season to give birth to her first child. Other notable absences include 2010 Commonwealth Games gold medalists Alice Falaiye, Sultana Frizell and Nicole Forrester.

The following athletes appeared on the preliminary Entry List, but not on the Official Start List of the specific event, resulting in total number of 28 competitors:

Medalists
The following Canadian competitor won a medal at the Championships

Results

Men

Decathlon

Women

Heptathlon

References

Nations at the 2011 World Championships in Athletics
2011 in Canadian sports
2011